El Arenal is a municipality and village in Santiago del Estero in Argentina.

References

Populated places in Santiago del Estero Province